Tedamali, also known as Telamali, is a Wayana village on the Lawa River in French Guiana.

Geography 

Notable people 
Wayana Boy, a musician whose real name is David Khana, lives in Tedamali.

Notes

References 

Indigenous villages in French Guiana
Maripasoula
Villages in French Guiana